Uhlmann is a German surname. Notable people with the surname include:

Chris Uhlmann (born 1960), Australian television presenter and journalist
Gunther Uhlmann (born 1952), a Chilean mathematician
Katie Uhlmann (born 1988), Canadian actor, producer and writer
Marianne Uhlmann, Swiss female curler, European champion
Wolfgang Uhlmann (born 1935), German chess grandmaster

German-language surnames